R.B. Umali is an American filmmaker, skate videographer, and photographer based out of New York City.

Filmmaking 
From the mid 1990s to the mid 2000s, Umali documented some of the finest New York City skateboarding while working for Zoo York, filming skaters such as Harold Hunter, Zered Bassett, and others. Umali filmed NYC skateboarding during and after attending film school at NYU.

In 2003, Umali premiered a documentary video R.B.'s Eastern Journey at the 2003 New York Underground Film Festival. In 2004, Umali released Vicious Cycle. In 2005, Umali released NY Revisited Vol 1 (96–97).

References

External links 
 Brooklyn Banks "A Retrospective Video" By R.B. Umali – 2020
 Mission Statement Episode 01: RB Umali – 2018
 RB Umali Recounts Life As a Filmer in the '90s NYC Skate Scene – 2016
 West 49 | RB Umali: Unreleased Interview – 2006

American skateboarders
Living people
Skate photographers
Skateboarding video directors
Year of birth missing (living people)